KM Communications, Inc. is the owner of several television and radio stations throughout the United States. The company, based in Skokie, Illinois, gets its name from the first names of its president, Myoung Hwa Bae and her husband, Kun Chae Bae. Their son, Kevin Joel Bae, is the General Manager of the company.

Founded in 1988, KM Communications has grown to nine radio stations and 10 television stations, with construction permits for seven additional radio and nine additional television stations.

The stations owned by KM Communications get their programming from a variety of sources, but the most common affiliation is with Westwood One for their radio stations and Youtoo America network for their television stations.

Station list

AM radio

KQMG 1220 kHz (Classic hits) Independence, Iowa

FM radio
KWKM-FM 95.7 MHz (Hot Adult Contemporary) St. Johns, Arizona
KTKB-FM 101.9 MHz (OPM) Hagåtña, Guam
WLCN-FM 96.3 MHz (Country) Atlanta, Illinois
WDLJ-FM 97.5 MHz (Classic rock) Breese, Illinois
WMKB-FM 102.9 MHz (Regional Mexican) Earlville, Illinois
KQMG-FM 95.3 MHz (Classic hits) Independence, Iowa
KHMR 104.3 MHz (Contemporary Christian) Lovelady, Texas

Class A television
WOCK-CD channel 4 (Infomercials on 13.1, Korean on 13.2) Chicago, Illinois 
WSKC-CD channel 22 (Munhwa Broadcasting Corporation on 22.1) Atlanta, Georgia

Low-power television
KTKB-LD channel 26 (The CW/Retro TV) Tamuning, Guam
K34JH-D channel 34 Winnfield, Louisiana ( Construction Permit granted, not on the air)
K44HN channel 44 Winnfield, Louisiana ( Construction Permit granted, not on the air)

Former radio stations formerly owned by KM Communications
KBKY-FM 94.1 MHz (Spanish Religious) Merced, California - Now Owned by Radio Alfa y Omega, LLC.

Former television stations formerly owned by KM Communications
KPIF channel 15 (MeTV) Pocatello, Idaho - Now owned by Ventura Broadcasting
KWKB channel 20 (This TV) Iowa City, Iowa - Now owned by HC2 Holdings
WBKM-LP channel 46 (Youtoo America) Chana, Illinois - Later owned by BKM Broadcasting; now defunct
WCRD-LP channel 44 (Youtoo America) Carthage, Illinois - Now owned by FXM Broadcasting
WMKB-LP channel 25 (Youtoo America) Rochelle, Illinois - Later owned by Diligent Broadcasting; now defunct
WMKE-CD channel 7 (Soul of the South Network) Milwaukee, Wisconsin - Now owned by CNZ Communications, LLC
WRDH-LP channel 7 (Youtoo America) Holcomb, Illinois - Now owned by CHN Media

Defunct television stations formerly owned by KM Communications
KEJB channel 43 (Was MyNetworkTV) El Dorado, Arkansas
KCFG channel 9 (silent) Flagstaff, Arizona
KNJO-LP channel 6 (Was America One) Holbrook, Arizona
KWKM-LP channel 10 (Was Youtoo America) Show Low, Arizona
KWSJ-LP channel 12 (Was Youtoo America) Snowflake, Arizona
KRDN-LP channel 5 (Was Daystar Television Network) Redding, California
WPNG-LP channel 3 Pearson, Georgia
WPDW-LP channel 26 Pearson, Georgia
KHIK-LP channel 47 Kailua-Kona, Hawaii
WOCH-CD channel 41 (Was Charge!) Chicago, Illinois
WIIB-LP channel 7 (Was America One) Farmersburg, Indiana
WHFE-LP channel 18 (Was America One) Sullivan, Indiana
WKMF-LP channel 32 (Was America One) Sullivan, Indiana
WVGO-LP channel 54 (Was America One) Sullivan, Indiana
W44CE channel 44 Vidalia, Louisiana
KTXF-LP channel 5 Abilene, Texas
KPPY-LP channel 53 Beaumont, Texas
KCCG-LP channel 33 Corpus Christi, Texas
KETK-LP channel 53 (Was NBC) Lufkin, Texas (Was controlled by ComCorp-owned KETK-TV)
KSVH-LP channel 23 Victoria, Texas
KBEO channel 11 (Was RTV) Jackson, Wyoming (satellite of KPIF)

Note
KM Communications should not be confused with the similarly named, Virginia-based KM Broadcasting, which is named after founders Robert Kelly and Peter Martine; that company owns WXOB-LP in Richmond.

Television broadcasting companies of the United States
Radio broadcasting companies of the United States
Companies based in Skokie, Illinois